Kumaraswamy or Coomaraswamy or Kumarasamy is a South Indian male given name. Due to the South Indian tradition of using patronymic surnames it may also be a surname for males and females. Kumaraswamy is one of the many names of the Hindu god Murugan.

Notable people

Given name
 Arumugampillai Coomaraswamy (1783–1836), Ceylonese politician
 C. Coomaraswamy (born 1887), Ceylonese civil servant and diplomat
 D. Kumaraswamy (born 1906), Indonesian community leader
 H. D. Kumaraswamy (born 1957), Indian politician
 K. N. Kumarasamy Gounder, Indian politician
 Kumaraswamy Pulavar (1854–1922), Ceylonese scholar and poet
 Palaniyappa Gounder Kumarasamy, Indian politician
 Poondi Kumaraswamy (1930-1988) Indian hydrologist
 P. Coomaraswamy (1849–1906), Ceylonese lawyer and politician
 P. S. Kumaraswamy Raja (1898–1957), Indian politician
 P. T. Kumarasamy Chetty, Indian politician and businessman
 S. Kumarasamy, Indian politician and social worker
 Sundar Kumarasamy, American educator
 S. V. Kumaraswamy (born 1918), Indian cricket official
 V. Coomaraswamy (1892-1972), Ceylonese civil servant and diplomat
 V. Kumaraswamy, Ceylonese lawyer and politician

Surname
 Ananda Coomaraswamy (1877–1947), Ceylonese historian and art philosopher
 Coomarasamy Balasingham (1917–2001), Ceylonese civil servant
 Coomaraswamy Vanniasingam (1911–1959), Ceylonese politician
 Indrajit Coomaraswamy (born 1950), Sri Lankan economist
 James Coomarasamy, British broadcaster
 Kumarasami Kamaraj (1903–1975), Indian politician
 Kumaraswamy Nandagopan (1976–2008), Sri Lankan paramilitary operative
 Muthu Coomaraswamy (1833–1879), Ceylonese politician, father of Ananda Coomaraswamy
 Punch Coomaraswamy (1925–1999), Singaporean judge and diplomat
 Radhika Coomaraswamy (born 1953), Sri Lankan lawyer
 Rajendra Coomaraswamy (1915–1981), Sri Lankan civil servant
 Satyendra Coomaraswamy (1920–1988), Sri Lankan cricketer

See also
 
 
 
 

Tamil masculine given names